Armacost may refer to:

Austin Armacost (born 1988), American TV personality and model
Michael Armacost (born 1937), American diplomat
Samuel Armacost (born 1940), American businessman, former CEO of BankAmerica Corporation
Wilbur H. Armacost (1893–1971), American mechanical engineer